Clapton Community Football Club is a football club based in Forest Gate, London, England.

History
Clapton Community was formed on 27 January 2018 by disillusioned supporters of Clapton F.C. after what they deemed as mismanagement of the club by chairman Vince McBean. During the club's debut season, Clapton Community sold 11,500 away shirts, with 5,500 to Spain, after the kit was based on the International Brigades and the Flag of the Second Spanish Republic.

On 11 May 2019, Clapton Community won the Middlesex County League Division One (Central and East), gaining promotion to the Premier Division, after a 3–0 win against FC Roast. Clapton Community entered the FA Vase for the first time in 2019–20.

In June 2019, the club announced the formation of a women's team with the former AFC Stoke Newington first team coming under the Clapton Community banner. The women's team competed in Division One of the Greater London Women's Football League in the 2019–20 season but were promoted to the London and South East Women's Regional Football League Division One North in the 2021–22 season. In Women FA Cup, they realised the biggest achievement in the history of the club, by eliminating Hounslow WFC (3rd division).

While the October 2020 Polish protests were taking place, the women's team expressed solidarity with the protesters by posing next to a banner dedicated to the women's rights protest, which has been noticed by Polish media.

On 12 March 2021, Clapton Community FC won the Football Supporter Association's 'Lockdown Heroes' award for their Community Fund initiative, 'Clapton against Corona', fundraising and providing financial assistance to local people who's livelihood was affected by coronavirus.

Ground

The men's team currently groundshare with Walthamstow at Wadham Lodge, after spending their first season at an adjacent ground, nicknamed by fans as the 'Stray Dog' after The Old Spotted Dog. The women's team now play at The Old Spotted Dog in Forest Gate.

On 17 September 2019, it was confirmed that Clapton Community had been awarded the lease at The Old Spotted Dog, following Clapton FC's eviction.  On 24 July 2020, Clapton Community announced that they had purchased the freehold for the Old Spotted Dog and become the new owners. 

The women's first team play at The Old Spotted Dog, using changing rooms at the nearby Stratford School. The men's first team plan to return soon on the completion of on site changing rooms. Clapton Community youth teams train at the ground.

The men's development team play at Hackney Marshes. The women's development team play at Tooting Common. Women's open access teams usually play at Jack Carter Centre, Gants Hill.

Clapton five-a-side teams, Clapton CFC Belters and Clapton CFC Massive play at Mabley Green in Hackney.

Supporters
Supporters of the club are known to be left-wing and are self-proclaimed anti-fascist. The club have a number of ultras groups such as the Clapton Punks, the Gravy Ultras, Brigata Ultra Clapton and the UmarellOldtras.

Honours and awards
Middlesex County League
Division One (Central and East) champions 2018–19
Hackney & Leyton Sunday Football League (Men's Development Team)
Division 3 champions 2021-22
Jim Rogers President's Cup
Winners 2018–19
Alec Smith Premier Division Cup
Winners 2021-22
John Greenacre Memorial Trophy
Winners 2021-22
Anagram Records Trophy
Runners-up 2018–19
Brian Lomax SD Cup
Runners-up 2018–19
Capitol Women's Cup
Runners-up 2021-22
Super 5 League (Women's 5s Team)
Winners 2020–21
Super 5s Beginners League (Women's 5s Team)
Winners 2021
Super 5s Legacy Tournament (Women's 5s Team)
Winners 2022
Super 5s Beginners League (Women's 5s Team)
Winners 2022
Amsterdam friendly tournament (Women's 5s Team)
Winners 2022
Super 5 League Intermediate B (Women's 5s Team)
Runners-up 2022
FSA Award Lockdown Heroes (Non-League)
Winners 2020–21

Records
Best FA Women's Cup performance: Third round, 2021–22
Best FA Vase performance: First qualifying round, 2019–20
Record attendance: 1,266 vs FC Roast, 11 May 2019

References

External links
Official website

Clapton F.C.
Association football clubs established in 2018
2018 establishments in England
Football clubs in England
Football clubs in London
Sport in the London Borough of Waltham Forest
Middlesex County Football League
Fan-owned football clubs in England
Phoenix clubs (association football)